Gareth John Pritchard Roberts (born 5 June 1968) is a British television screenwriter and novelist, best known for his work related to the science-fiction television series Doctor Who. He has also worked on various comedy series and soap operas.

Early life
Roberts studied drama at King Alfred's College (now the University of Winchester) and Liverpool Polytechnic (now Liverpool John Moores University). He has also worked as a clerk at the Court of Appeal.

Career
Roberts has worked on some of the most popular British soap operas, including Channel 4's now-defunct Brookside as a scriptwriter (1999–2003), and as a story associate on ITV's Coronation Street in 1997. In 1998 he worked as a script editor on ITV's other long-running soap, Emmerdale, moving across to write several episodes himself the following year.

Doctor Who and others
During the 1990s, Roberts was associated with the range of Doctor Who spin-off novels published by Virgin Books. He contributed several novels to both their New Adventures and Missing Adventures ranges of Doctor Who fiction. He also wrote some Cracker novelisations for Virgin, and a gay erotic novel named The Velvet Web under the pseudonym Christopher Summerisle, the title of which also happened to be an episode of the Doctor Who serial The Keys of Marinus.

He continued his association with Doctor Who in the 2000s, penning several feature articles and comic strips for Doctor Who Magazine, co-writing audio plays and short stories based on the series with Clayton Hickman for Big Finish Productions, and in 2005 writing another Doctor Who novel, Only Human, based on the characters from the new series launched that year, for BBC Books' New Series Adventures range. A further novel, I am a Dalek, was released in 2006 and featured the Tenth Doctor. I am a Dalek is part of a Government "Quick Reads initiative". He also co-wrote The New Gods with Rebecca Levene, the first Tomorrow People audio drama for Big Finish.

Roberts appeared as a contributor to the documentary Serial Thrillers, exploring the popular Philip Hinchcliffe era of Doctor Who between 1975 and 1977, which featured as an extra on the 2004 DVD release of the serial Pyramids of Mars.

On 25 December 2005, a special 'interactive' mini-episode of Doctor Who written by Roberts, Attack of the Graske, was broadcast, and can now be accessed on the BBC website (only available to UK Broadband Users). Roberts also wrote a series of "TARDISODEs", short videos available online and via mobile phones promoting the 2006 series of Doctor Who.

He has written four full episodes of Doctor Who, "The Shakespeare Code" in 2007, "The Unicorn and the Wasp" in 2008, "The Lodger" in 2010 and "Closing Time" in 2011. He co-wrote 2014's "The Caretaker" with show runner Steven Moffat.

Roberts also co-wrote, with Russell T Davies, "Invasion of the Bane", the pilot episode of the Doctor Who spin-off series The Sarah Jane Adventures. He wrote two two-part stories for the full series of The Sarah Jane Adventures, which began broadcasting in the autumn of 2007, and another two two-part stories for the 2008 series.

Roberts co-wrote with Davies again for the second of the 2009 specials of Doctor Who, "Planet of the Dead".

Gareth Roberts has also written a novelisation of Shada, the uncompleted Tom Baker (Fourth Doctor) story written by Douglas Adams, that was due to be the finale of season seventeen of Doctor Who in 1979 before it was abandoned due to industrial action. The book was published by BBC Books on 15 March 2012.

Other work
In comedy, Roberts has worked in collaboration with The Fast Show writer and performer Charlie Higson on the sitcom Swiss Toni, a spin-off from The Fast Show. He also collaborated with Higson on scripts for the second series of Randall and Hopkirk for BBC One in 2001. He would reteam with Higson for the superhero-style series Jekyll & Hyde, based on the novel. It was not renewed for a second series.

Roberts has also contributed sketches to the Channel Five sketch show Swinging, and wrote for the fantasy series The Librarians.

Roberts and Gary Russell wrote Virgin Books' episode guide to The Simpsons, I Can't Believe It's an Unofficial Simpsons Guide (1997), under the pseudonyms Warren Martyn and Adrian Wood. Text from the book's expanded edition, I Can't Believe It's a Bigger and Better Updated Unofficial Simpsons Guide (2000), was subsequently published on the BBC website's Cult TV section.

Transphobia controversy

On 3 September 2017, Roberts posted on his Twitter account, "I [love] how trannies choose names like Munroe, Paris and Chelsea. It's never Julie or Bev is it?" Later that same day he wrote "It's almost like a clueless gayboy's idea of a glamorous lady. But of course it's definitely not that." These comments were condemned by some Twitter users.

In June 2019, it was leaked that Roberts' contribution for a Doctor Who short story collection had been dropped due to his previous tweets, as well as the threat from other writers to withdraw their contributions. Roberts responded with a blog post on Medium in which he stated: "I don’t believe in gender identity. It is impossible for a person to change their biological sex."

Personal life 
Roberts is gay.

Bibliography

Books
 The Highest Science (Doctor Who New Adventure, 1993)
 Tragedy Day (Doctor Who New Adventure, 1994)
 Zamper (Doctor Who New Adventure, 1995)
 The Romance of Crime (Doctor Who Missing Adventure, 1995)
 To be a Somebody (Cracker novelisation, 1996)
 Best Boys (Cracker novelisation, 1996)
 The English Way of Death (Doctor Who Missing Adventure, 1996)
 The Plotters (Doctor Who Missing Adventure, 1996)
 The Well-Mannered War (Doctor Who Missing Adventure, 1997)
 Only Human (Doctor Who New Series Adventure, 2005)
 I am a Dalek (Doctor Who New Series Adventure, 2006)
 Shada: The Lost Adventure by Douglas Adams (Doctor Who Novelisation. 2012)

Short stories
Short stories in:
 Decalog 2: Lost Property (1995)
 Decalog 3: Consequences (1996)
 More Short Trips (1999)
 Short Trips and Sidesteps (2000)
 Short Trips: The Muses (2003)
 Doctor Who Annual 2006 (2005)
 The Doctor Who Storybook 2007 (2006)

Television scripts

References

External links

 Disposable Media Issue 9 Interview
 BBC Books to publish novelisation of Douglas Adams' Shada
 SFX interview about adapting "Shada"

1968 births
Living people
Alumni of Liverpool John Moores University
Alumni of the University of Winchester
British soap opera writers
British television writers
British science fiction writers
English television writers
English screenwriters
English male screenwriters
English soap opera writers
British gay writers
British LGBT screenwriters
English LGBT writers
Writers of Doctor Who novels
20th-century British novelists
21st-century British novelists
British male television writers